Walter J. Cookson (April 17, 1876 – June 11, 1936), Republican politician, was mayor of Worcester, Massachusetts in 1936. Cookson was elected mayor after serving several years on the School Committee.  Only a few months after his election, he collapsed and died of a heart attack in his Cleveland hotel room while attending the 1936 Republican National Convention. He is the last Republican to serve as Mayor of Worcester.  Cookson Field, an  park near Worcester's College of the Holy Cross is named in his honor.

References

1876 births
1936 deaths
Mayors of Worcester, Massachusetts
Massachusetts Republicans